"Lötzen" Infantry Brigade was an army formation in Nazi Germany, created on 16 August 1939 on the basis of existing Landwehr regiment in eastern East Prussia in order to add flank protection for the 3rd Army in its invasion into Poland. The brigade was made up of two Landwehr regiments (each consisting 3 battalions) and one Landwehr engineer battalion. The brigade included three infantry regiments and an artillery regiment, formed in the Landwehr mode (reservists aged 35–45), a battalion of sappers and reconnaissance and communications departments. In November 1939, the brigade was reformed in Giżycko and merged into the 311th Infantry Division commanded by General Paul Goeldner.

Structure
Landwehr-Infanterie-Regiment 161
Landwehr-Infanterie-Regiment 162
Landwehr-Artillerie-Regiment 161
Landwehr-Pionier-Bataillon 161
Landwehr-Aufklärungs-Schwadron 161
Landwehr-Versorgungs-Einheiten 161 
Grenzwacht-Regiment

References

Military units and formations established in 1939
East Prussia
Military units and formations disestablished in 1940
Brigades of the German Army in World War II